The 2018–19 FA Trophy (known for sponsorship reasons as the Buildbase FA Trophy) is the 50th season of the FA Trophy, an annual football competition for teams at levels 5–8 of the English National League System.

Calendar
The calendar for the 2018–19 Buildbase FA Trophy, as announced by The Football Association.

One team at Level 8 did not enter (Guernsey). This was the first year to have an Extra Preliminary Round, due to the increase from 72 to 88 teams in the Level 7 leagues.

Extra preliminary round

Preliminary round

First Round Qualifying

Second Round Qualifying

Third Round Qualifying

First round proper

Second round proper

Third round proper
Following their victory over Weymouth, Ramsbottom United are the lowest-ranked team still in the competition, and the only team left from the eighth tier of English football.

Fourth round proper

Semi-finals

First leg

Second leg

Leyton Orient won 3–1 on aggregate

AFC Fylde won 3–2 on aggregate

Final

Top scorers

References

FA Trophy seasons
England
FA Trophy